Claudia Mills is an American author of children's books. She is also an associate professor of philosophy at the University of Colorado Boulder.

Bibliography

After-School Superstars Series
 Nixie Ness, Cooking Star, Holiday House, 2019
 Vera Vance, Comics Star, Holiday House, 2020
 Lucy Lopez, Coding Star, Holiday House, 2020
 Boogie Bass, Sign Language Star, Holiday House, 2021

The Nora Notebooks Series
 The Nora Notebooks: The Trouble With Ants, Alfred A. Knopf Books for Young Readers, 2015
 The Nora Notebooks: The Trouble With Babies, Alfred A. Knopf Books for Young Readers, 2016
 The Nora Notebooks: The Trouble With Friends, Alfred A. Knopf Books for Young Readers, 2017

Franklin School Friends Series
 Kelsey Green, Reading Queen, Farrar, Straus and Giroux, 2012
 Annika Riz, Math Whiz, Farrar, Straus and Giroux, 2014
 Izzy Barr, Running Star, Farrar, Straus and Giroux, 2015
 Simon Ellis, Spelling Bee Champ, Farrar, Straus and Giroux, 2015
 Cody Harmon, King of Pets, Farrar, Straus and Giroux, 2016

Mason Dixon Series
 Mason Dixon: Pet Disasters, Alfred A. Knopf Books for Young Readers, 2011
 Mason Dixon: 4th Grade Disasters, Alfred A. Knopf Books for Young Readers, 2011
 Mason Dixon: Basketball Disasters, Alfred A. Knopf Books for Young Readers, 2012

Gus and Grandpa Series
 Gus and Grandpa, Farrar, Straus and Giroux, 1997
 Gus and Grandpa and the Christmas Cookies, Farrar, Straus and Giroux, 1997
 Gus and Grandpa Ride the Train, Farrar, Straus and Giroux, 1998
 Gus and Grandpa at the Hospital, Farrar, Straus and Giroux, 1998
 Gus and Grandpa and the Two-Wheeled Bike, Farrar, Straus and Giroux, 1999
 Gus and Grandpa and Show-and-Tell, Farrar, Straus and Giroux, 2000
 Gus and Grandpa at Basketball, Farrar, Straus and Giroux, 2001
 Gus and Grandpa and the Halloween Costume, Farrar, Straus and Giroux, 2002
 Gus and Grandpa Go Fishing, Farrar, Straus and Giroux, 2003
 Gus and Grandpa and the Piano Lesson, Farrar, Straus and Giroux, 2004

West Creek Middle School Series
 Losers, Inc., Farrar, Straus and Giroux, 1997
 You're a Brave Man, Julius Zimmerman, Farrar, Straus and Giroux, 1999
 Lizzie at Last, Farrar, Straus and Giroux, 2000
 Alex Ryan, Stop That!, Farrar, Straus and Giroux, 2003
 Makeovers by Marcia, Farrar, Straus and Giroux, 2005

Dinah Series
 Dynamite Dinah, Macmillan, 1990
 Dinah for President, Macmillan, 1992
 Dinah in Love, Macmillan, 1993
 Dinah Forever, Farrar, Straus and Giroux, 1995

Other
 Luisa's American Dream, Four Winds, 1981
 At the Back of the Woods, Four Winds, 1982
 The Secret Carousel, Four Winds, 1983
 All The Living, Macmillan, 1983
 What about Annie?, Walker, 1985	
 Boardwalk with Hotel, Macmillan, 1985
 The One and Only Cynthia Jane Thornton, Macmillan, 1986
 Melanie Magpie, Bantam, 1987
 Cally's Enterprise, Macmillan, 1988
 After Fifth Grade, the World!, Macmillan, 1989
 Hannah on Her Way, Macmillan, 1991
 A Visit to Amy-Claire, Macmillan, 1992
 Phoebe's Parade, Macmillan, 1994
 The Secret Life of Bethany Barrett, Macmillan, 1994
 One Small Lost Sheep, Farrar, Straus and Giroux, 1997
 Standing Up to Mr. O., Farrar, Straus and Giroux, 1998
 7 x 9 = Trouble!, Farrar, Straus and Giroux, 2002
 Perfectly Chelsea, Farrar, Straus and Giroux, 2004
 Ziggy's Blue-Ribbon Day, Farrar, Straus and Giroux, 2005
 Trading Places, Farrar, Straus and Giroux, 2006	
 Being Teddy Roosevelt, Farrar, Straus and Giroux, 2007
 The Totally Made-up Civil War Diary of Amanda MacLeish, Farrar, Straus and Giroux, 2008
 How Oliver Olson Changed the World, Farrar, Straus and Giroux, 2009
 One Square Inch, Farrar, Straus and Giroux, 2010
 Fractions=Trouble!, Farrar, Straus and Giroux, 2011
 Zero Tolerance, Farrar, Straus and Giroux, 2013
 Write This Down, Farrar, Straus and Giroux, 2016
 The Lost Language, Holiday House, 2021

References

External links

Year of birth missing (living people)
Living people
American children's writers
DePauw University faculty